Myxobolus cuneus is a species of Myxozoa, a parasitic Cnidarian within the family Myxobolidae, found in Sao Paulo. M. cuneus hosts Piaractus mesopotamicus, often being found in the gill bladder, urinary bladder, gills, spleen, fins, head surface, liver, and heart within the fish.

References 

Animals described in 2006
Fauna of Brazil
Myxobolidae